Fall of Bin Jawad (2016) refers to ISIL takeover of Libyan city of Bin Jawad on 4 January 2016 during its oil crescent region. On Monday morning, the terrorist group imposed full control over the city of Bin Jawad in the Sirte District, after a series of intense firefights with rebel forces that are loyal to the Libyan provisional government in Tripoli.

References

Conflicts in 2016
Military operations of the Second Libyan Civil War involving the Islamic State of Iraq and the Levant
Military operations of the Second Libyan Civil War in 2016
January 2016 events in Africa